Sohail Khan (born 1970) is an Indian actor and filmmaker.

Other notable people with the same name include:

 Sohail Khan (cricketer, born 1967)
 Sohail Khan (cricketer, born 1984)